Newport is an unincorporated community in Augusta County, Virginia, United States.

The Moffett's Creek Schoolhouse and Walker's Creek Schoolhouse are listed on the National Register of Historic Places.

References

Unincorporated communities in Augusta County, Virginia
Unincorporated communities in Virginia